The Federation Automobile de l'Ukraine is an international non-governmental organization that unites citizens for the development and promotion of motor sports, road transport, and tourism in Ukraine. 

The FAU is a member of FIA.

References

External links
 

Automobile associations
Auto racing organizations
Sports governing bodies in Ukraine
Transport organizations based in Ukraine
Organizations established in 1992
1992 establishments in Ukraine